4CC is a three-letter acronym that may refer to:
 Four Continents Figure Skating Championships
 FourCC - a sequence of four bytes used to uniquely identify data formats, especially video formats
 4CC (AM) - a radio station in Gladstone and Rockhampton, Queensland, Australia
 NER Class 4CC, a class of 2 British 4-cylinder compound locomotives